Hanafjellet is the commonly used name for the small mountain located in the city of Sandnes in the western part of the large municipality of Sandnes in Rogaland county, Norway.  "Hanafjellet" or "Hana Hills" lies in the northern part of the borough of Hana, separating Hana from the small village of Aspervika. The Vatneleiren military base lies just east of the mountain.

References

Mountains of Rogaland
Sandnes